Every given year in the Muay Thai world, with few exceptions, three different major "Fighter of the Year" awards are presented. The Sports Writers Association of Thailand in the first half of a year annually, the Sports Authority of Thailand decides the winner at the end of December, and the Siam Kela award is given in March annually.

Sports Writers Association of Thailand 
The Sports Writers Association of Thailand started giving out their Fighter of the Year award in 1984. Prior to 1984, they had only given the "Athlete of the Year Award".

In its history, there have only ever been four fighters to have won the award more than once: Kaensak Sor.Ploenjit in 1989 and 1990, Saenchai Sor.Kingstar in 1999 and 2008, Anuwat Kaewsamrit in 2003 and 2004, lastly Panpayak Jitmuangnon, the only ever to have won it three times, from 2013 to 2015.

Thongchai Tor.Silachai is by far the oldest recipient of the award as he won it at 30 years old in 2001. He defeated former rival Saenchai Sor.Kingstar by 2 years as Saenchai won the award for a second time at 28 years old in 2008.

The only time there have been two winners of the award was in 2012, when Yodwicha Por.Boonsit and Sangmanee Sor.Tienpo shared the award. Coincidentally, Sangmanee is the youngest winner in the history of the award, narrowly beating out Yodwicha by 30 days as they were both 15 years old at the time.

In 2019, controversy struck the Sports Writers Association of Thailand as they revoked Rungnarai Kiatmuu9 of his 2018 Fighter of the Year award after he was knocked out by Yothin F.A.Group just days after he had received the award.

Sports Authority of Thailand 
The Sports Authority of Thailand Fighter of the Year award is awarded annually in December.

In the history of the award, only two fighters have won it more than once: Nong-O Sit-Or and Sagetdao Petpayathai.

Siam Kela 
The Siam Kela award is given on March 6 every year.

The award is not strictly for Muay Thai. In fact, Muay Thai is only a small part of their award ceremonies. Recipients of the award also receive a prize of ฿50,000 baht.

References 

Muay Thai awards